Miroslav Šperk (born 1984) is a Paralympic athlete from the Czech Republic, competing mainly in category F56 Discus events.

Biography
Miroslav competed in the shot and discus at the 2004 Summer Paralympics, winning silver in the discus throw. Four years later at the 2008 Summer Paralympics in Beijing, Miroslav made 5th place in the discus throw.

References

External links
 Profile at the South Bohemian University

Paralympic athletes of the Czech Republic
Athletes (track and field) at the 2004 Summer Paralympics
Paralympic silver medalists for the Czech Republic
Living people
1984 births
Medalists at the 2004 Summer Paralympics
Paralympic medalists in athletics (track and field)
Czech male discus throwers